Conway's puzzle, or blocks-in-a-box, is a packing problem using rectangular blocks, named after its inventor, mathematician John Conway. It calls for packing thirteen 1 × 2 × 4 blocks, one 2 × 2 × 2 block, one 1 × 2 × 2 block, and three 1 × 1 × 3 blocks into a 5 × 5 × 5 box.

Solution

The solution of the Conway puzzle is straightforward once one realizes, based on parity considerations, that the three 1 × 1 × 3 blocks need to be placed so that precisely one of them appears in each 5 × 5 × 1 slice of the cube. This is analogous to similar insight that facilitates the solution of the simpler Slothouber–Graatsma puzzle.

See also
 Soma cube

References

External links
 The Conway puzzle in Stewart Coffin's "The Puzzling World of Polyhedral Dissections"

Packing problems
Recreational mathematics
Tiling puzzles
Mechanical puzzle cubes
John Horton Conway